The following television stations operate on virtual channel 13 in Canada:

 CBCT-DT in Charlottetown, Prince Edward Island
 CBKFT-DT in Regina, Saskatchewan
 CFCN-DT-5 in Lethbridge, Alberta
 CFEM-DT in Rouyn-Noranda, Quebec
 CHAU-DT-5 in Percé, Quebec
 CHBC-DT-1 in Penticton, British Columbia
 CHMI-DT in Winnipeg, Manitoba
 CIII-DT-13 in Timmins, Ontario
 CIMT-DT-2 in Trois-Pistoles, Quebec
 CIMT-DT-4 in Baie-Saint-Paul, Quebec
 CITV-DT in Edmonton, Alberta
 CJOH-DT in Ottawa, Ontario
 CKCO-DT in Kitchener, Ontario
 CKRT-DT-3 in Rivière-du-Loup, Quebec
 CKTM-DT in Trois-Rivières, Quebec

13 virtual TV stations in Canada